The National Catholic Bioethics Quarterly is a peer-reviewed journal that examines ethical, philosophical, and theological questions generated by the continuing progress of modern medicine and technology. It is published by the National Catholic Bioethics Center to foster inquiry on moral issues. The journal is edited by Edward Furton. Online access provided by the Philosophy Documentation Center.

Awards 
 2015
 2012
 2010
 2008
 2005
 2003
1st Place for General Excellence in a Scholarly Magazine, Catholic Press Association

See also 
 List of ethics journals

References

External links 
 

Bioethics journals
English-language journals
Publications established in 2001
Quarterly journals
Philosophy Documentation Center academic journals